Quentin de Parseval (born 21 September 1987) is a French footballer who plays as a defender.

He signed for then-Ligue 2 side Amiens SC in the summer of 2006 from Angers SCO.

External links
 

1978 births
Living people
Footballers from Orléans
Association football defenders
French footballers
Angers SCO players
Amiens SC players